Abu Sulaym Faraj al-Khadim al-Turki, sometimes erroneously called Faraj ibn Sulaym, was an Abbasid court eunuch and official.

In 787, Caliph Harun al-Rashid established a new province encompassing the borderlands with the Byzantine Empire in Cilicia and Upper Mesopotamia. As part of this, he sent Faraj to rebuild and repopulate the city of Tarsus. Faraj first sent 3,000 Khurasanis to the city, followed by a thousand each from the Syrian districts of al-Massisa and Antioch. The troops arrived in June 788 and encamped outside the city until the reconstruction of its walls, and the erection of a mosque, were completed. Furthermore, he supervised the very first prisoner exchange with the Byzantines recorded by al-Mas'udi for Harun's reign, in 805, on the Lamos River. Faraj evidently played an important role in the Byzantine frontier, as he is attested as the collector of the tithe in the area during the last years of Harun al-Rashid, and is recorded as having restored the "palace of Sayhan" in the area, and as the owner of a house in Antioch.

He is mentioned in 819, as accompanying the captured anti-caliph, Ibrahim ibn al-Mahdi, into the presence of Caliph al-Ma'mun.

References

Sources
 
 
 
 

8th-century people from the Abbasid Caliphate
9th-century people from the Abbasid Caliphate
Eunuchs of the Abbasid Caliphate
Courtiers of the Abbasid Caliphate
Abbasid people of the Arab–Byzantine wars
History of Tarsus